29 may refer to:
29 (number), the natural number following 28 and preceding 30
one of the years 29 BC, AD 29, 1929, 2029
29 (album), a 2005 Ryan Adams album
"29" (Loïc Nottet song), a 2019 Loïc Nottet song
"29" (Demi Lovato song), a 2022 song by American singer Demi Lovato
"Twenty Nine", a song by Karma to Burn from the album Wild, Wonderful Purgatory, 1999
29, a variant of Twenty-eight (card game)